Hàng Bông (French language: Rue du Coton) is a street in ancient quarter of Hanoi. It continues from the crossroad Hàng Bông - Hàng Gai - Hàng Trong - Hàng Hom to the former city gate  Cửa Nam (South Gate) with length about 932 m. Hàng Bông was once a street which produced cotton to make clothes or winter blankets. Today Hàng Bông is one of the busiest streets of Hanoi for shopping with art galleries, silk shops, and clothes shops.

References

External links
 
 Hang Bong street map- An introduction to Hang Bong street with map and nearby attractions.
 Phố và đường Hà Nội Vinh Phúc Nguyễn, 2010

Streets in Hanoi
Culture of Hanoi
Vietnamese cuisine